Scincella schmidti  is a species of skink found in China.

References

Scincella
Reptiles described in 1927
Taxa named by Thomas Barbour